Stein Inge Brækhus (born 12 February 1967 in Trondheim, Norway) is a Norwegian jazz musician (drums) and record producer, known from a series of album releases and as a key musician at the Jazz scenes of Stavanger and Bergen.

Career 
Brækhus grew up and lives in Os close to Bergen, where he was recognised as a promising drummer at an early age, in bands like "Creation" (1982–84), "Chippie" (1982–84), debuted at Molde Festival 1984 with Oslo band "Celeste", together with the well known jazz musicians Bendik Hofseth and Øystein Sevåg, and was known throughout Norway as a member of the successful band Cutting Edge (1984–86) from Oslo, and the bands Night & Day, Hot Cargo, Knut Kristiansen, Daniel Amaro, Bergen Big Band, Dabrhahi, Jan Ove Nordeide in Bergen, og Silje Nergaard's "Mellow Yellow" and Olga Konkova Trio in Oslo, in Sweden with the band "barT" along with the American pianist Jim Beard, and otherwise with Nils Petter Molvær, Jan Bang, "Trio de Janeiro". He has also contributed in bands and on releases with Åge Aleksandersen, Bjørn Eidsvåg, Jan Eggum, Karoline Krüger, Secret Mission, Vamp (Månemannen), "Elle Melle", "The Norwegian Fords", Ole Thomsen, Astrid Kloster's release SPOR with Kenneth Siversten's compositions, Knut Kristiansen, Karl Seglem/Håkon Høgemo, Ole Jacob Hystad Quartet, Ivar Kolve, Kenneth Sivertsen, Ole Amund Gjersvik, Lars Erik Drevvatne, Tone Lise Moberg, Phil McDermott, Tor Yttredal, Helene Bøksle, Tazano, Paolo Fresu and SUBTRIO with baritone saxophonist John Pål Inderberg.
 
Brækhus has had production work and was much engaged TV 2 the first years after they started. He has run his own mobile recording studio "Breakhouse Studio" from (1997–). Brækhus are working permanently and teaches at the Institute for Music & Dance (IMD) University of Stavanger.

Honors 
2001: Vossajazzprisen
2002: Gammleng-prisen in the class Studio musician
2013: Mølsterprisen

Discography (in selection) 
1986: Duesenberg (Curling Legs), within "Cutting Edge»
1992: Nattjazz 20 År (Grappa Music), within "Night and Day" (Linda Farestveit, Knut Kristiansen & Per Jørgensen)
1992: Hot Cargo (NorCD), within "Hot Cargo" the band of guitarist Ole Thomsen
1992: Utla (NorCD), with Håkon Høgemo/Karl Seglem
1993: Rit (NorCD), with Karl Seglem
1993: Dacapo (Grappa Music), with Jan Eggum
1997: Touch of time (Gemini Records), within "Ole Jacob Hystad Quartet»
1998: Ope (NorCD), within Ivar Kolve Trio
1998: One day in October (Nimis), with Kenneth Sivertsen
1998: History & Movement (Da-Da) with Didrik Ingvaldsen
1998: Milonga Triste (Acoustic Records), with Ole Amund Gjersvik
2000: En Annen Sol (Majorforlaget), with Vamp
2001: Keys on and Off (Acoustic Music), with Lars Erik Drevvatne
2002: Nye nord (NorCD), with Karl Seglem
2004: Innover (Curling Legs ), within Ivar Kolve Trio
2004: Live at Sting (Dravle Records), within "Subtrio" feat. Paolo Fresu
2005: Seagull (Grappa Music), within Bergen Big Band feat. Karin Krog (2005)
2005: Blues for Ell (Dravle Records), within "Knut Kristiansen Trio»
2006: Loking On (NorCD), with Tone Lise Moberg
2007: Dabrhahi (NorCD), with Olav Dale
2008: Som den gyldne sol frembryter (Grappa Music), within "Bergen Big Band»
2009: St. Fin Barre's (Leo Records), in trio with guitarist Mark O'Leary and organist Ståle Storløkken
2009: Horneland (NorCD), with Line Horneland
2010: Now (AnJazz), within Phil McDermott Quintet
2013: 'TAZANO (Inner X), with Anania Ngoliga, Tor Yttredal, John Mponda and Jørn Øien
2013: CIRRUS Méli Mélo (NorCD), with Eva Kirstine Bjerga Haugen, Inge Weatherhead Breistein and Theodor Barsnes Onarheim

References

External links 
Breakhouse Studio Official Website

20th-century Norwegian drummers
21st-century Norwegian drummers
Norwegian jazz drummers
Male drummers
Norwegian jazz composers
Norwegian record producers
1967 births
Living people
Musicians from Bergen
20th-century drummers
Male jazz composers
20th-century Norwegian male musicians
21st-century Norwegian male musicians
Cutting Edge (band) members